Bob Martin is a British television drama-comedy. Its concept bears significant resemblance to The Larry Sanders Show. Michael Barrymore, Keith Allen and Denis Lawson are its principal actors. It was made by Granada Television for the ITV network from 2 April 2000 to 4 June 2001.

References

External links
 

ITV sitcoms
2000s British sitcoms
2000 British television series debuts
2001 British television series endings
Television series by ITV Studios
Television shows produced by Granada Television
English-language television shows